A collins glass is a glass tumbler which typically will contain . It is commonly used to serve sparkling cocktails, especially long drinks like the Tom Collins or John Collins. Its cylindrical shape, narrower and taller than a highball glass, keeps the drink carbonated longer by reducing the surface area of the drink.

See also 

 Old fashioned glass

References 

Drinking glasses
Drinkware